Luciano Giovannetti (born 25 September 1945) is an Italian sport shooter and two-time Olympic champion. He won a gold medal in trap shooting at both the 1980 Summer Olympics and the 1984 Summer Olympics. He is the first trap shooter to successfully defend the Olympic title. He celebrated his victory in 1980 by tossing his cap into the air and shooting a hole through it.

References

External links
 

1945 births
Living people
Italian male sport shooters
Trap and double trap shooters
Olympic shooters of Italy
Olympic gold medalists for Italy
Shooters at the 1980 Summer Olympics
Shooters at the 1984 Summer Olympics
Shooters at the 1988 Summer Olympics
Olympic medalists in shooting
Medalists at the 1984 Summer Olympics
Medalists at the 1980 Summer Olympics
20th-century Italian people